Goodlett is a surname. Notable people with the surname include:

Carlton Benjamin Goodlett (1914–1997), American physician, newspaper publisher and civil rights activist
John A. Goodlett, American politician
Ray Goodlett, American soccer player
Sasha Goodlett (born 1990), American women's basketball player

See also
Goodlett Gin, a historic cotton gin in Historic Washington State Park in Hempstead County, Arkansas, United States